Magaya may refer to
Magaya Corporation, a logistics software company founded in 2001 in Miami, U.S.
Alison Magaya (died 2015), South Sudanese politician and diplomat
Cosmas Magaya (1953–2020), Zimbabwean mbira player, teacher and cultural ambassador